The 2005 season was the Minnesota Vikings' 45th in the National Football League (NFL), and Mike Tice's fourth and final season as head coach. The Vikings finished the season with a 9–7 record and missed the playoffs despite going 8–3 over the final 11 weeks. Quarterback Daunte Culpepper was injured after seven games, resulting in Brad Johnson taking over as starter. The loss of Culpepper and the departure of Randy Moss to the Oakland Raiders resulted in the Vikings dropping from 2nd in passing offense in 2004 to 20th in 2005.

During the team's bye week in week 5, a scandal arose surrounding an alleged sex party aboard a pair of boats on Lake Minnetonka.

Offseason
In February 2005, Vikings owner Red McCombs agreed to sell the team to Arizona-based entrepreneur Reggie Fowler; however, Fowler was unable to prove his finances sound enough to complete the purchase and his application to buy the team was rejected by the league. He brought in various partners, including New York-based real estate developer Zygi Wilf, who took over as the lead owner, with Fowler as one of the minor partners. The deal to install Wilf as owner was concluded in May 2005.

Acquisitions

Departures

Trades

2005 Draft

 The Vikings traded WR Randy Moss to the Oakland Raiders in exchange for Oakland's first- and seventh-round selections (7th and 219th overall), and LB Napoleon Harris.
 The Vikings traded their fourth- and fifth-round selections (120th and 154th overall) to the Washington Redskins in exchange for Washington's fourth-round selection (112th overall).
 The Vikings traded their seventh-round selection (230th overall) to the New York Jets for LB Sam Cowart.

Preseason

Schedule

Game summaries

Week 1: vs. Kansas City Chiefs

Week 2: at New York Jets

Week 3: vs. San Diego Chargers

Week 4: at Seattle Seahawks

Regular season

Schedule

Note: Intra-division opponents are in bold text.

Game summaries

Week 1: vs. Tampa Bay Buccaneers

The Vikings opened the season with five turnovers on the way to their first opening-day loss since 2002. Free agent signing Darren Sharper started off the scoring for the Vikings by returning an interception 88 yards for a touchdown, but the Buccaneers defense was able to limit the Vikings to 26 yards rushing and intercepted reigning Pro Bowl quarterback Daunte Culpepper three times, including two for cornerback Brian Kelly. By contrast, the Buccaneers' rookie running back Cadillac Williams managed 148 yards rushing in his first NFL game, capped off with a 71-yard touchdown run with less than two minutes left to seal the game for Tampa Bay.

Week 2: at Cincinnati Bengals

The Vikings' misfortunes continued in Week 2, losing 37–8 to the Cincinnati Bengals. Cornerback Fred Smoot was beaten by Chad Johnson on a 70-yard touchdown in the first minute of the game, with Carson Palmer adding two more touchdown passes in the first half to give the Bengals a 27–0 lead at halftime. The Bengals piled on 167 yards rushing, with wide receiver T. J. Houshmandzadeh adding a 16-yard touchdown run in the third quarter. Daunte Culpepper continued his early season struggles, throwing five interceptions, bringing his total to eight in the first two weeks. Culpepper did ensure the Vikings avoided the shutout by scoring on a five-yard touchdown run. The Vikings were again hampered by their rushing attack, being held to 77 yards rushing.

Week 3: vs. New Orleans Saints

In Week 3, the Vikings looked to turn their season around at home to the New Orleans Saints, who were suffering from the effects of Hurricane Katrina, which had devastated their city only a few weeks earlier. The Vikings started positively, forcing a fumble from the Saints' return man Aaron Stecker on the opening kickoff. On the first play from scrimmage, Daunte Culpepper found Travis Taylor for a 24-yard touchdown, and the Vikings did not look back. Culpepper threw two more first-half touchdown passes, and stayed mistake free. The Vikings also found a running game, going for 146 yards, led by Mewelde Moore's 101 yards. Defensively, the Vikings held Aaron Brooks to just 12 completions on 32 pass attempts, intercepting him twice (Antoine Winfield and Keith Newman). Paul Edinger added four field goals for the Vikings in the victory.

Week 4: at Atlanta Falcons

After notching their first win of the season the week before, the Vikings returned to form in Atlanta the following week, losing 30–10 to the Falcons. The visitors sacked Daunte Culpepper nine times, and added two more interceptions to bring his total for the season to 10 through four games. The Falcons' rushing offense was almost unstoppable, going for 285 yards, with almost half of that total provided by Warrick Dunn (126 yards). For the second time in the season, the Vikings' only points of the game came in the fourth quarter, via a 16-yard pass from Culpepper to Troy Williamson.

Week 6: at Chicago Bears

Following a bye week marred by the "love boat" scandal, the Vikings returned to action with a trip to face the 1–3 Chicago Bears. The Vikings marched down the field on their opening drive, only to botch a fake field goal attempt from the 18-yard line. After trading several punts, the Vikings put together a 13-play drive that resulted in a 23-yard field goal by Paul Edinger, who was making his first return to Chicago, for whom he had played for the last five years. However, those were to be the Vikings' only points of the game as they failed to get any further than the Bears' 30-yard line, while Daunte Culpepper added another two interceptions to his total for the season. The Bears' offense was limited by rookie quarterback Kyle Orton, who threw for 117 yards, but did find Desmond Clark for two touchdowns. The Bears were also held to 95 yards, led by 89 yards by Thomas Jones, who did find the end zone twice in the fourth quarter to close out the game.

Week 7: vs. Green Bay Packers

The Vikings hosted the Packers in Week 7 with the two teams propping up the NFC North with 1–4 records. After a scoreless first quarter, Brett Favre started to find success against the Vikings defense, leading the Packers on two-second-quarter touchdown drives in a row, culminating in touchdown passes to Donald Driver and Antonio Chatman. After the Chatman touchdown, Koren Robinson returned the ensuing kickoff 72 yards to the Packers' 30-yard line, only for Mewelde Moore to fumble on the Vikings' first play from scrimmage. Favre then led the Packers downfield, and set up a 53-yard Ryan Longwell field goal as time expired in the first half, giving the Packers a 17–0 lead. The Vikings mounted a comeback in the second half; starting with a field goal on their opening drive, the Vikings defense then forced a three-and-out, before Daunte Culpepper capped the next drive with a 27-yard touchdown pass to Marcus Robinson. After a missed field goal by Longwell, Paul Edinger made a field goal of his own before Culpepper again led the Vikings down the field, finding Mewelde Moore for a 14-yard touchdown to give the Vikings a 20–17 lead with three minutes left. Favre then led the Packers down the field, resulting in a 39-yard Ryan Longwell field goal, to tie the game with 28 seconds left. Daunte Culpepper then completed back-to-back passes to Mewelde Moore and Marcus Robinson to set up a game-winning 56-yard field goal by Edinger as time expired.

Week 8: at Carolina Panthers

The Vikings failed to build on their come-from-behind win, falling to a 38–13 loss to the Carolina Panthers in Week 8. The Panthers received the opening kickoff and mounted a 10-play drive, resulting in a 7-yard touchdown run by Stephen Davis. On the final play of the first quarter, Daunte Culpepper tore his ACL, MCL and PCL in a low tackle by Panthers cornerback Chris Gamble following an 18-yard run. Brad Johnson replaced Culpepper at quarterback, but he was unable to prevent the Panthers from increasing their lead in the first half, going into the halftime interval with the score at 24–0. The Vikings did find the end zone twice in the second half, first with a Mewelde Moore touchdown to bring the score to 24–7, then a five-yard touchdown reception by Marcus Robinson with two minutes to go; however, the Panthers scored twice themselves to nullify the Vikings' attempted comeback. Panthers receiver Steve Smith finished the day with 11 catches for 201 yards.

Week 9: vs. Detroit Lions

With Culpepper out for the rest of the season, Brad Johnson made his first start for the Vikings since week 2 of the 1998 season. After a defensively dominated first quarter resulting in only a Vikings field goal, Johnson found Michael Bennett for a five-yard touchdown in the second quarter. Joey Harrington then fumbled on a Brian Williams sack, leading to a touchdown run by Ciatrick Fason. Harrington then compounded the Lions' problems, throwing an interception to Antoine Winfield three plays later, leading to a 15-yard touchdown pass from Johnson to Nate Burleson, giving the Vikings a 24–0 lead. The Lions added a touchdown before halftime on an Artose Pinner run. After a scoreless third quarter, Harrington found Marcus Pollard for a 23-yard touchdown on the first play of the fourth quarter, cutting the Vikings lead to 10. In an attempt to wind down the clock, the Vikings leant on their running game, rushing for 164 yards, including 106 yards by Michael Bennett. Darren Sharper sealed the victory for the Vikings, intercepting Harrington with 18 seconds left to give the Vikings their third victory of the season.

Week 10: at New York Giants

In Week 10, the Vikings traveled to the Meadowlands seeking consecutive victories for the first time in the season against the 6–2 New York Giants. The Vikings were unable to capitalize on a fumble by Willie Ponder on the opening kickoff, as Paul Edinger missed a 40-yard field goal after the Vikings failed to earn a first down. After trading punts, Eli Manning was intercepted by Darren Sharper, only for Edinger to have a 32-yard field goal attempt blocked on the ensuing possession. After the scoreless first quarter, Sharper intercepted Manning a second time, this time returning it 92 yards for his second touchdown of the season. The Vikings offense was unable to add to the scoreboard in the first half, and a pair of field goals from Jay Feely meant the Vikings went into the halftime break with a 7–6 lead. To start the second half, Koren Robinson returned the opening kickoff 86 yards for a touchdown, giving the Vikings a 14–6 lead. The Giants responded immediately, with Manning finding Amani Toomer for a 23-yard touchdown pass to again reduce the Vikings' lead to a single point. The Vikings punted on their next possession, before forcing the Giants to do the same, with Mewelde Moore returning Jeff Feagles' kick 71 yards to give the Vikings a 21–13 lead; the score made the Vikings the first team in NFL history to return an interception, kickoff and punt for a touchdown in the same game. Manning was intercepted two more times, including a third for Sharper; however, a non-existent Vikings offense (including 12 yards rushing on 21 carries) meant the Giants still had a chance. Following the two-minute warning, Manning put together a drive in which he completed 5 out of 7 pass attempts, leading to a three-yard touchdown run by Tiki Barber; Barber then ran in the two-point conversion to tie the scores. With 1:21 left, Johnson was sacked by Osi Umenyiora on the first play of the ensuing drive. After a Giants timeout trying to get the ball back, Johnson completed passes to Jermaine Wiggins, Marcus Robinson and Travis Taylor to set up Paul Edinger's 48-yard game-winning field goal, giving the Vikings consecutive wins for the first time in 2005.

Week 11: at Green Bay Packers

The Vikings were again on the road in Week 11, traveling to Green Bay for a Monday night contest against the 2–7 Packers, as the Vikings attempted to get back to .500 and reignite their hopes of making the playoffs; however, the Vikings fell behind in the first quarter with Brett Favre finding Donald Driver for a 15-yard touchdown. The Vikings leveled the scores late in the second quarter, with Dovonte Edwards returning an interception 51 yards for a touchdown, only for Favre to throw another touchdown pass to Driver, hitting him on a 53-yard touchdown with 28 seconds remaining, to give the Packers a 14–7 halftime lead. Late in the third quarter, the Vikings snapped a streak of eight consecutive quarters without an offensive touchdown, tying the game on a 1-yard touchdown by Ciatrick Fason at the end of a 14-play drive. A fourth-quarter Edinger field goal gave the Vikings the lead for the first time in the game, only to be matched by a Longwell field goal with three minutes remaining. The Packers then attempted a short kickoff to avoid a big return by Koren Robinson, only to give the Vikings strong field position. Mewelde Moore ran three times for 18 yards on the drive, giving him 122 yards for the game. Brad Johnson then found Robinson for 35 yards, bringing the Vikings to the Packers' 6-yard line. After three kneeldowns by Brad Johnson to run down the clock, Edinger connected on a 27-yard field goal as time expired, giving the Vikings their third consecutive victory.

Week 12: vs. Cleveland Browns

The Vikings returned home in Week 12 to face the 4–6 Cleveland Browns, seeking their fourth straight victory, and a return to a winning record. Brad Johnson recorded his best game of the season so far, throwing for 207 yards and three touchdowns, all to Marcus Robinson, while Mewelde Moore added a further 67 yards rushing. Defensively, Darren Sharper intercepted both Browns quarterbacks, Trent Dilfer and Charlie Frye, while Antoine Winfield also picked off Dilfer. The Vikings also sacked Dilfer five times, and held Cleveland to 78 yards rushing. The Browns did find the end zone with one minute remaining, with Dennis Northcutt catching a 9-yard touchdown pass from Dilfer.

Week 13: at Detroit Lions

The Vikings headed to Detroit in Week 13 seeking their fifth straight win, and an opportunity to firmly entrench themselves in the playoff race against the 4–7 Lions. The Vikings completely shut down Jeff Garcia and the Lions passing attack, holding him to 17 completions on 35 attempts for 126 yards. Offensively, Brad Johnson bettered his performance from the previous week against the Browns, completing 17 of 23 passes for 256 yards and two touchdowns, including an 80-yard touchdown pass to Koren Robinson in the first quarter. Michael Bennett also had a strong game, scoring touchdowns in the second and third quarters, finishing with 89 scrimmage yards. The Lions finally scored a touchdown in the fourth quarter, as an Artose Pinner rushing touchdown brought them to within five points with 7:42 remaining. After the Lions forced a Vikings punt, Corey Chavous intercepted Jeff Garcia on the goal line with a minute remaining, securing the Vikings fifth consecutive victory.

Week 14: vs. St. Louis Rams

The Vikings returned home again in Week 14 to face a St. Louis Rams team quarterbacked by rookie Ryan Fitzpatrick making his second career start. The Vikings opened the scoring with a 13-yard end-around by Koren Robinson. Both teams added a pair of field goals each in the second quarter, resulting in the Vikings taking a 13–6 lead into the locker at halftime. The Rams capped their opening drive of the second half with a 14-yard touchdown run from Fitzpatrick to tie the contest. The Vikings responded with a long pass from Brad Johnson to Marcus Robinson, setting up a 7-yard touchdown run by Michael Bennett. Fitzpatrick then threw five interceptions to four different Vikings (Brian Williams (2), Darren Sharper, Fred Smoot, and Antoine Winfield), as the Vikings increased their lead to 14 points on a touchdown run from Ciatrick Fason. There were no further points in the fourth quarter, with the Vikings holding on despite Johnson only throwing for 146 yards, to give them an 8–5 record on the season.

Week 15: vs. Pittsburgh Steelers

The Vikings hosted the Pittsburgh Steelers in Week 15. With both teams holding an 8–5 record, victory was essential for their playoff chances. The Vikings had a strong defense and only allowed a 21-yard field goal by Jeff Reed on the Steelers' first possession; however, the offense struggled and had to be content with tying the scores with a Paul Edinger field goal late in the first quarter. Brad Johnson struggled in particular, and was intercepted by both Joey Porter and Deshea Townsend in the first half. Ben Roethlisberger scored the game's only touchdown towards the end of the second quarter, running in from three yards. Johnson failed to complete a pass in the second half, and the Vikings' only first down came via a penalty. Reed added two more field goals for the Steelers in the third quarter, and rounded out the game's scoring with a fourth-quarter safety after tackling Michael Bennett in the end zone. The loss put the Vikings at 8–6 and on the brink of playoff elimination.

Week 16: at Baltimore Ravens

In Week 16, the Vikings traveled to Baltimore for a Christmas night game in the knowledge that a loss would eliminate them from playoff contention. Brad Johnson recovered from his poor performance against the Steelers and led the Vikings to a touchdown on their opening drive, finding Travis Taylor on a 13-yard pass for the score. Kyle Boller responded for the Ravens, leading them on a 17-play drive that culminated with a 6-yard touchdown reception for Todd Heap. It took until late in the second quarter for the next points to arrive, with Johnson finding Jermaine Wiggins in the end zone on a 5-yard pass with 1:06 remaining in the half; however, Matt Stover cut the Vikings' lead to 14–10 going into the half with a 37-yard field goal as time expired. The Vikings opened the second half with a 36-yard field goal from Paul Edinger, only for the Ravens to score with passes of 47 yards and 39 yards to Mark Clayton and Derrick Mason respectively, either side of another Edinger field goal to leave the Vikings trailing 24–20 with 14:47 remaining in the game. The Ravens' defense forced two consecutive punts and a Brad Johnson fumble, which resulted in two field goals by Stover to give the Ravens a 30–20 lead with just over a minute to play. Edinger cut the Ravens' lead to 7 points with 15 seconds remaining, but the Ravens recovered the ensuing onside kick, giving the Ravens the win, and eliminating the Vikings from the playoffs.

Week 17: vs. Chicago Bears

With the Vikings now out of the playoff race, they returned home for the final game of the season against the division champion Chicago Bears, who would go into the playoffs as the NFC's #2 seed. The Bears rested their now-healthy starting quarterback Rex Grossman, with Kyle Orton under center. Orton and running back Thomas Jones led the Bears to a field goal to start the scoring, before most prominent Bears players were removed from the game at the end of the first quarter. With the Bears defense now missing the likes of Brian Urlacher, Lance Briggs and Charles Tillman, the Vikings scored 17 points in the second quarter, starting with a 54-yard Paul Edinger field goal, followed by a 2-yard run by Ciatrick Fason and a 17-yard pass from Brad Johnson to Travis Taylor. Johnson threw for 247 yards and two touchdowns in the game, with Mewelde Moore adding 101 yards from scrimmage. Moore added another touchdown for the Vikings late in the third quarter, followed by another Edinger field goal from 27 yards to start the fourth. The Bears found the end zone in the fourth quarter on a 4-yard touchdown pass from Jeff Blake to Justin Gage. The Vikings then capped the scoring with a 61-yard touchdown run from Michael Bennett, giving Minnesota a 34–10 win, securing a winning season for the Vikings. Defensively, the Vikings held the Bears to 97 yards passing, with Kevin Williams recording two sacks. Despite the team finishing with a winning record, owner Zygi Wilf announced the dismissal of head coach Mike Tice only a few hours after the game.

Standings

Statistics

Team leaders

League rankings

Staff

Final roster

References

Minnesota Vikings seasons
Minnesota
Minnesota